Atano III is a Basque pelota short fronton located at the Anoeta Sports Complex in San Sebastián, Basque Autonomous Community, Spain.

History
The fronton was built in 1963 by the municipality, due to the high demand by the professional and aficionate players of the Gipuzkoa province, originally named Anoeta fronton. In 1995, after repair and maintenance work the fronton was renamed after Mariano Juaristi Mendizábal who played with the pseudonym of "Atano III", often considered one of the best pelotaris of all time.

Modalities
The main modalities played in the Atano III fronton are Hand-pelota and Paleta-rubber. Atano III is one of the frontons which held one of the most important yearly competitions in the sport, the 1st Hand-Pelota Championship, with 40 finals played there until the current date.

Events
These are the most notable events held in the Atano III since the name change in 1995.

1st Hand-pelota category Championship finals
Total: 16

* In 1999, two separate finals were played, due to a disagreement between the two organising companies, Asegarce and Aspe: the Aspe final was played in the Atano III (as listed above), and the Asegarce one in the Astelena (won by Eugi over Elkoro, 22–11).

2nd Hand Pelota category Championship finals

Total: 4

Doubles-Pelota Championship finals
Total: 11

Cuatro y Medio Championship finals
Total: 2

References

Fronton (court)
Basque pelota
Sports venues in the Basque Country (autonomous community)
Sport in San Sebastián
1963 establishments in Spain
Sports venues completed in 1963